Châlons Agglo, formally the , is a communauté d'agglomération around Châlons-en-Champagne in the French department of Marne in the region of Grand Est. It was formed in January 2000 from the previous district de Châlons-en-Champagne, which consisted of 9 communes. In 2014 it was expanded to 38 communes, when it was merged with the three communautés de communes of l'Europort, Jâlons, and la Région de Condé-sur-Marne, except that Pocancy in Jâlons joined the communauté de communes de la Région de Vertus  (the three communautés de communes were respectively named after Vatry Europort, Jâlons, and Condé-sur-Marne). In January 2017, the 8 communes of the former communauté de communes de la Région de Mourmelon joined the communauté d'agglomération de Châlons-en-Champagne. Its area is 810.4 km2. Its population was 79,518 in 2018, of which 44,246 in Châlons-en-Champagne proper.

Composition

References

External links
 Official website

Châlons-en-Champagne
Châlons-en-Champagne
Châlons-en-Champagne